In mathematics, a family, or indexed family, is informally a collection of objects, each associated with an index from some index set. For example, a family of real numbers, indexed by the set of integers is a collection of real numbers, where a given function selects one real number for each integer (possibly the same) as indexing.

More formally, an indexed family is a mathematical function together with its domain  and image  (that is, indexed families and mathematical functions are technically identical, just point of views are different.) Often the elements of the set  are referred to as making up the family. In this view, indexed families are interpreted as collections of indexed elements instead of functions.

Sequences are one type of families indexed by natural numbers. In general, the index set  is not restricted to be countable. For example, one could consider an uncountable family of subsets of the natural numbers indexed by the real numbers.

Formal definition

Let  and  be sets and  a function such that

Sometimes angle brackets or braces are used instead of parentheses, although the use of braces risks confusing indexed families with sets.

Functions and indexed families are formally equivalent, since any function  with a domain  induces a family  and conversely. Being an element of a family is equivalent to being in the range of the corresponding function. In practice, however, a family is viewed as a collection, rather than a function. 

Any set  gives rise to a family  where  is indexed by itself (meaning that  is the identity function). However, families differ from sets in that the same object can appear multiple times with different indices in a family, whereas a set is a collection of distinct objects. A family contains any element exactly once if and only if the corresponding function is injective.

An indexed family  defines a set  that is, the image of  under  Since the mapping  is not required to be injective, there may exist  with  such that  Thus, where  denotes the cardinality of the set  For example, the sequence  indexed by the natural numbers  has image set  In addition, the set  does not carry information about any structures on  Hence, by using a set instead of the family, some information might be lost. For example, an ordering on the index set of a family induces an ordering on the family, but no ordering on the corresponding image set.

Indexed subfamily

Examples

Indexed vectors

For example, consider the following sentence:

Here  denotes a family of vectors. The -th vector  only makes sense with respect to this family, as sets are unordered so there is no -th vector of a set. Furthermore, linear independence is defined as a property of a collection; it therefore is important if those vectors are linearly independent as a set or as a family.

Matrices

Suppose a text states the following:

For example, consider the matrix

The set of the rows consists of a single element  as a set is made of unique elements so it is linearly independent, but the matrix is not invertible as the matrix determinant is 0. On the other hands, the family of the rows contains two elements indexed differently such as the 1st row  and the 2nd row  so it is linearly dependent. The statement is therefore correct if it refers to the family of rows, but wrong if it refers to the set of rows. (The statement is also correct when "the rows" is interpreted as referring to a multiset, in which the elements are also kept distinct but which lacks some of the structure of an indexed family.)

Other examples

Let  be the finite set  where  is a positive integer.
 An ordered pair (2-tuple) is a family indexed by the set of two elements,  each element of the ordered pair is indexed by each element of the set 
 An -tuple is a family indexed by the set 
 An infinite sequence is a family indexed by the natural numbers.
 A list is an -tuple for an unspecified  or an infinite sequence.
 An  matrix is a family indexed by the Cartesian product  which elements are ordered pairs; for example,  indexing the matrix element at the 2nd row and the 5th column.
 A net is a family indexed by a directed set.

Operations on indexed families

Index sets are often used in sums and other similar operations. For example, if  is an indexed family of numbers, the sum of all those numbers is denoted by

When  is a family of sets, the union of all those sets is denoted by

Likewise for intersections and Cartesian products.

Usage in category theory

The analogous concept in category theory is called a diagram. A diagram is a functor giving rise to an indexed family of objects in a category , indexed by another category , and related by morphisms depending on two indices.

See also

References

 Mathematical Society of Japan, Encyclopedic Dictionary of Mathematics, 2nd edition, 2 vols., Kiyosi Itô (ed.), MIT Press, Cambridge, MA, 1993.  Cited as EDM (volume).

Basic concepts in set theory
Mathematical notation